Stephen Parker may refer to:

Stephen Parker (academic), Vice-Chancellor of the University of Canberra
Stephen Parker (American football) (born 1984), American football offensive guard
Stephen Parker (senior) (c.1790–c.1880), early settler of Western Australia; see Stephen Stanley Parker
Stephen Henry Parker (1846–1927), Q.C., M.L.C., son of Stephen Stanley Parker
Stephen Stanley Parker (1817–1904), J.P., M.L.C., son of Stephen Parker (senior)
Stephen Parker, actor in Teenage Monster
Stephen Parker, Head of Post Office Application Support, Fujitsu; a witness in cases related to the British Post Office scandal.

See also
Steven Parker (disambiguation)
Steve Parker (disambiguation)